Ilet (Elnet, Ilet) is a river in Mari El, Russia. Major tributaries are the Ashit, Yushut, Voncha and Petyalka. Minimum mineralization is 1000–1400 mg/L. Tourism and rafting are popular.

References 

Rivers of Mari El
Rivers of Tatarstan